Lifesblood for the Downtrodden is the eighth studio album by American sludge metal band Crowbar, released on February 8, 2005 through Candlelight Records. Its working title in 2004 had been You Don't Need an Enemy to Have a War. It is dedicated to the memory of guitarist Dimebag Darrell, who died after the band had recorded the album. The song "Coming Down" appeared on Fear Candy 13, a compilation CD issued by British extreme metal magazine Terrorizer.

Track listing

Music videos
 "Dead Sun" (filmed in Miami, Florida, around August 2004 and directed by John-Martin Vogel and Robert Lisman)
 "Slave No More" (filmed in Miami, Florida, on June 21, 2005 and directed by John-Martin Vogel)

Personnel
Crowbar
Kirk Windstein – vocals (tracks 1–11), rhythm guitar (tracks 1–10)
Steve Gibb – lead guitar, rhythm guitar (track 11)
Rex Brown – bass, acoustic guitar, keyboards
Craig Nunenmacher – drums

Additional musicians
 Sid Montz – piano on "Lifesblood"

Production
 Rex Brown – producer
 Warren Riker – producer, engineering, mixing
 Scott "Ish" Campbell – engineering, mixing (track 11)
 Brett "Cosmo" Thorngren – mastering

References

2005 albums
Crowbar (American band) albums